Episteme: A Journal of Individual and Social Epistemology is a quarterly peer-reviewed academic journal covering epistemology. It was established in 2004 and is published by Cambridge University Press. The editor-in-chief is Jennifer Lackey (Northwestern University); the founding editors were Leslie Marsh (University of British Columbia) and Chris Onof (Imperial College London).

Abstracting and indexing
The journal is abstracted and indexed in the Arts and Humanities Citation Index, EBSCO databases, Modern Language Association Database, Philosopher's Index, and Scopus.

References

External links

Epistemology journals
Publications established in 2004
Cambridge University Press academic journals
English-language journals
Quarterly journals